Burnsville is an unincorporated community in Anson County, North Carolina, United States.

Geography
Burnsville is located at latitude 35.112 and longitude -80.245. The elevation is 522 feet. It is located along North Carolina Highway 742.

References

 

Unincorporated communities in Anson County, North Carolina
Unincorporated communities in North Carolina